Suleman Musa (born 15 June 1973) is a Nigerian judoka. He competed at the 1992 Summer Olympics and the 1996 Summer Olympics.

References

1973 births
Living people
Nigerian male judoka
Olympic judoka of Nigeria
Judoka at the 1992 Summer Olympics
Judoka at the 1996 Summer Olympics
Place of birth missing (living people)
African Games medalists in judo
African Games gold medalists for Nigeria
African Games silver medalists for Nigeria
African Games bronze medalists for Nigeria
Competitors at the 1991 All-Africa Games
Competitors at the 1995 All-Africa Games
Competitors at the 1999 All-Africa Games
Competitors at the 2003 All-Africa Games
20th-century Nigerian people
21st-century Nigerian people